Thirudathey Papa Thirudathey is 2018 Malaysian Tamil-language romantic comedy drama film directed and produced by Shalini Balasundaram under the banner of Story Films SDN BHD. The film stars Saresh D7, Shalini Balasundaram, and Yuvaraj Krishnasamy.

Plot
The heroine finds for a perfect guy in her life to get married and then she meets the hero eventually they fall in love and the rest of the plot is about how they handle the hardships and struggle in their journey of love.

Cast
 Saresh D7
Shalini Balasundaram as Amutha
Kabil Ganesan
Yuvaraj Krishnasamy as Krishna
Irfan Zaini
Manjula
Jegan
Hema G.

Production
The film is about social issues such a theft. The film is based on Shalini Balasundaram's encounters with theft throughout her life. Shalini Balasundaram worked on the script for eight months with her husband Sathish Natarajan. Saresh D7, who was last seen in Sughamaai Subbulakshmi, stars in the film. Yuvaraj Krishnasamy was cast as Saresh D7's best friend. Unlike Shalini Balasundaram's first film Geethaiyin Raadhai, this film incorporated action with romance.

Soundtrack 
Ztish, who composed for Shalini Balasundaram's Geethaiyin Raadhai, composed for this film.

Reception
A critic from Vimarsagan Media gave the film a mixed review and criticised the tragic scenes and found the story lacking.

Awards
 2019  PAAIM Johor Awards - Best Actress in a Supporting - Hema G

Box office
The film was a box office success and grossed RM322,400.00. The film was the second highest grossing Malaysian Tamil film of the year 2018.

References

External links
 

2018 films
2010s Tamil-language films
Malaysian romantic comedy films
Tamil-language Malaysian films
2018 romantic comedy films